Koutso is a settlement in the Vistonida municipal unit, Xanthi regional unit of Greece. It is located 7 kilometers east of Genisea, 5 kilometers southeast of Nea Kessani, and 15.5 kilometers northwest of Xanthi. According to the 2011 census, the population was 749 inhabitants. In 1981, the population of Koutso was around 1118 inhabitants. In 1991, the population dropped to around 510 inhabitants.

References

External links
Greek Travel Pages - Koutso

Populated places in Xanthi (regional unit)